William Done (4 October 1815 – 17 August 1895) was an English cathedral organist, who served at Worcester Cathedral

Background

He was born in Worcester on 4 October 1815, the son of a baker.  He was a chorister at Worcester Cathedral from 1825 (under Charles E. J. Clarke, the Cathedral Organist), then an articled pupil of Clarke from 1828 to 1835, and then Clarke's deputy organist. When Clarke died in 1844, Done succeeded him as Organist.

He remained organist for 51 years. In 1894, after 50 years of service, he was awarded the Lambeth degree of D.Mus.

In 1889, Done (by this stage in his seventies) handed his duties to the Assistant Organist Hugh Blair, but remained titular Organist until his death in 1895, whereupon Blair succeeded him.

References

English classical organists
British male organists
Cathedral organists
1815 births
1895 deaths
19th-century English musicians
19th-century British male musicians
Musicians from Worcester, England
19th-century classical musicians
Male classical organists
19th-century organists